Grant Orchard is a British animation director and designer who lives and works in London. He is the creator of the CBeebies series Hey Duggee. Based at Studio AKA, he has created many eye-catching spots for a wide range of clients. On 24 January 2012, he was nominated for an Academy Award for the animated short film A Morning Stroll.

He studied animation at the University for the Creative Arts.

References

External links

Living people
British film directors
Year of birth missing (living people)